YATA may refer to:

Yata Station, a train station in Japan
Youth Atlantic Treaty Association

Mythology
Yata no Kagami, a sacred mirror
Yata (Lakota mythology), the personification of the east wind in Lakota mythology

People
Yata Kouji (1933–2014), Japanese voice actor